Ferrybank is a suburb of Waterford City in Ireland. Much of Ferrybank, or "the village" as it is referred to locally, is under the political jurisdiction of Waterford City and County Council and thus an area of administration for Waterford City, on the northern bank of the River Suir, extending into County Waterford. However, some parts of Ferrybank extend into County Kilkenny and are administered by Kilkenny County Council. There has been a long lasting boundary dispute between both jurisdictions, with debates and proposals ongoing for many decades.

Sport
Ferrybank hurling club won the Waterford Senior Hurling Championship in 1915, 1916 and 1919. Locky Byrne is an inter-county hurler who was from the area, and played for both the Waterford and Kilkenny teams in the 1930s and 1940s. Athletic events have been held in Ferrybank since 1869. Ferrybank AC members to represent Ireland include Brendan Quinn at the 1988 Olympics and Kelly Proper at the 2010 European Championships. Association footballer John O'Shea, of Manchester United and the Republic of Ireland national team, played underage football with Ferrybank AFC.

Ghost shopping centres
The Ross Abbey Town Centre Shopping Complex was built in 2008 at a cost of €7 million and was sold in 2013 for €225k. It remained empty for several years after it was constructed. In 2017 (nearly 10 years after the complex was completed) the discount retailer "Mr Price" opened a unit within the development.

The Ferrybank Shopping Centre on the south Kilkenny/Waterford border was completed in 2008 at a cost of €100m. It never opened, due to the failure of Dunnes Stores to take up its planned anchor tenancy, and (as of late 2022) remained closed. While containing no retail outlets, part of the development has housed a local library and county council office.

People
 Donal Foley, a writer and editor at The Irish Times, grew up in Ferrybank
 John O'Shea, former international footballer, lived and went to school in Ferrybank.

References

Geography of Waterford (city)
Towns and villages in County Kilkenny